Vergnet is a French wind turbine manufacturer headquartered in Orléans. The company also produces water pumps installed in Africa.

Vergnet wind turbines are small to midsize (the newest model is rated for 1MW) designed for operation in tropical countries: Caribbean, Africa, parts of Asia and South America. They are robust, designed to resist hurricanes (by parking the turbine close to the ground), and easy to assemble on site with self erecting components (no tall crane required) from factory-made kits.

In 2008, Vergnet got a large contract for 120 1MW turbines in Ethiopia. .

References 
 Official website
  Analysis of the company by a stock market commentator (in French)
  News article on the contract in Ethiopia (in French)

Wind turbine manufacturers
Engineering companies of France
Wind power in France
French brands
Renewable energy companies of France